Back to Basics: The Essential Collection 1971–1992 is the third greatest hits album by English-Australian singer Olivia Newton-John, released on 9 June 1992 by Geffen Records. It is the first compilation to contain both her country and pop hits. The album contained four new tracks: lead single "I Need Love" (produced by Giorgio Moroder), US Adult Contemporary top-20 single "Deeper Than a River", "Not Gonna Be the One" and a cover version of Brenda Lee's 1960 US number one "I Want to Be Wanted". A tour was planned to promote the album, but had to be cancelled when Newton-John was diagnosed with breast cancer.

Release
The album was released with different track listings in different territories in order to feature her biggest hits in each region.
Although the album did not chart highly in the US, it was a long-term big seller and eventually certified Gold. The album was a bigger success in the UK and Australia.

Track listing

Charts

Certifications

References

1992 greatest hits albums
Geffen Records compilation albums
Olivia Newton-John compilation albums